Argyrodes nasutus, is a species of spider of the genus Argyrodes. It is endemic to Sri Lanka.

See also
 List of Theridiidae species

References

Theridiidae
Endemic fauna of Sri Lanka
Spiders of Africa
Spiders described in 1880